Sinogold is a Chinese automobile manufacturer headquartered in Shandong, China, that specializes in producing electric vehicles.

History
Sinogold was founded by Zhongwei Wang in 2016, and is based in Shandong. Sinogold joined with Shandong Guojin (Kingold) Automobile Manufacturing Co. in May 2016. Sinogold's factory stamps, welds, assembles, and paints all Sinogold vehicles.

Sinogold produced the K01 and the K03 in 2016, but they both failed to enter production. They later became the GM3.

There first production vehicle was the G60, which was later renamed the Sinogold GM3. It came out in 2017 and was a compact MPV heavily inspired by the Citroen Grand C4 Picasso. Its dimensions are 4,615 mm/1,845 mm/1,655 mm, and a top speed of 60 kilometres per hour. In May 2017, Sinogold was sued for advertising a picture of the Citroen C4 instead of the Sinogold GM3.

As of December 2021, patent images of a rebadged Chery Arrizo 5e surfaced wearing the Sinogold logo. The electric compact car was codenamed SGA7000BEV3 and later unveiled to be the Sinogold Junxing. The Junxing features slightly restyled front grilles and front and rear bumpers with a length of 4572mm or 4602mm, a width of 1825mm and a height of 1496mm. The wheelbase is 2670mm long. The maximum power output was listed as 120kW.

Vehicles

Current models
Sinogold currently has two production vehicles.

See also
 Leapmotor
 Min'an Electric
 Nio
 Bordrin

References

Electric vehicle manufacturers of China
Car brands
Car manufacturers of China
Chinese brands
Sinogold vehicles